Valeri Alikov or Valery Alikov also known as Valeri Mikor (Валери Микор) (1 January 1960 – 11 September 2016) was a Hill Mari-speaking Mari poet, critic and translator.

Life 
Alikov was born in Novaya Sloboda (Äвäсир) village of Gornomariysky District, and died in 2016 after a serious illness (lung cancer).

In the years 1995-2007, Valery Alikov released the literary magazine "Tsikmӓ" which he named after the capital of his district, Tsikmӓ (Цикмӓ or Kozmodemyansk).

References

1960 births
2016 deaths
People from Gornomariysky District
Mari people